Sani Musa Abdullahi, known as Sani Danja or Danja (born 20 April 1973), is a Nigerian film actor, producer, director, singer, and dancer. He participates in both Kannywood and Nollywood. In April 2018 he was turbaned by the Etsu Nupe, Yahaya Abubaka, as Zakin Arewa.

Career
He ventured into the Hausa movie scene in 1999 in Dalibai (student). Danja also produced and directed films, including Manakisa, Kwarya tabi Kwarya, Jaheed, Nagari, Wasiyya, Harsashi, Gidauniya, Daham, Jarida, Matashiya, and others. He made his 2012 Nollywood debut in Daughter of the River.

Filmography
Sani Musa Danja has acted, produced and directed in Kannywood and Nollywood movies. Amongst them are:

See also
 List of Nigerian actors
 List of Nigerian film producers
 List of Nigerian film directors
 List of Kannywood actors

References

1973 births
Living people
21st-century Nigerian male actors
Kannywood actors
Male actors in Hausa cinema
Nigerian film producers
Nigerian male dancers
21st-century Nigerian male singers
Nigerian male television actors
Nigerian film directors